Baldwin IV (1108 – 8 November 1171) was count of Hainaut from 1120 to his death.

Baldwin IV was the son of Count Baldwin III of Hainaut and Yolande de Wassenberg. Also known as Baldwin the Builder, he purchased the property of Ath in 1158 and built the Burbant tower. He ceded the locality of Braine-la-Willotte, also known as Braine-le-Comte, to the chapter of Sainte-Waudru in 1158. In 1159, he incorporated the seigniory of Chimay and in 1160 the châtellenies of Valencians and of Ostrevent.

Baldwin IV married Alice, heiress of Namur, and had the following children:
 Yolande (1131–1202), married first to Ivo II, Count of Soissons, and second to Hugh IV, Count of St Pol
 Baldwin (1134–1147)
 Agnes (1142–1168), married Ralph I, Lord of Coucy and had children including Yolande de Coucy, wife of Robert II, Count of Dreux.
 Geoffrey, Count of Ostervant (1147–1163), first husband of Eleanor, Countess of Vermandois
 Lauret(t)a (1150–1181), married first to Thierry of Alost, and second to Bouchard IV, Count of Montmorency
 Baldwin V (1150–1195), also count of Flanders by his marriage to Margaret I of Flanders.

References

See also
Counts of Hainaut family tree

House of Flanders
Baldwin IV
Margraves of Namur
1108 births
1171 deaths